Manfred Ritschel (born 7 June 1946 in Schwabach) is a retired German football player. He spent eight seasons in the Bundesliga with Borussia Dortmund, Kickers Offenbach, 1. FC Kaiserslautern and FC Schalke 04. He represented Germany three times, including an UEFA Euro 1976 qualifier against Bulgaria (he scored an equalizer in a 1–1 draw) and two friendlies.

References

External links 
 

1946 births
Living people
German footballers
Germany international footballers
FC Ingolstadt 04 players
SSV Jahn Regensburg players
Borussia Dortmund players
Kickers Offenbach players
1. FC Kaiserslautern players
FC Schalke 04 players
SpVgg Greuther Fürth players
Bundesliga players
2. Bundesliga players
People from Schwabach
Sportspeople from Middle Franconia
Association football midfielders
Footballers from Bavaria
20th-century German people
West German footballers